Singhalorthomorpha cingalensis, is a species of millipedes in the family Paradoxosomatidae. It is endemic to Sri Lanka, first found from Pundaluoya Valley, Nuwara Eliya.

References

Polydesmida
Endemic fauna of Sri Lanka
Millipedes of Asia
Animals described in 1865